Sipaneopsis is a genus of flowering plants belonging to the family Rubiaceae.

Its native range is Colombia to Southern Venezuela and Northern Brazil.

Species
Species:

Sipaneopsis cururuensis 
Sipaneopsis duckei 
Sipaneopsis foldatsii 
Sipaneopsis huberi 
Sipaneopsis maguirei 
Sipaneopsis morichensis 
Sipaneopsis pacimonensis 
Sipaneopsis rupicola

References

Rubiaceae
Rubiaceae genera